James Henry Clarke (born 1913) was an English professional footballer who played as an inside right.

Career
Born in Broomhill, Clarke played for Mexborough Athletic, Bradford City and Goole Town. For Bradford City he made nine appearances in the Football League.

He later played for Rotherham United and Chesterfield.

Sources

References

1913 births
Year of death missing
English footballers
Association football inside forwards
Mexborough Athletic F.C. players
Bradford City A.F.C. players
Goole Town F.C. players
Rotherham United F.C. players
Chesterfield F.C. wartime guest players
English Football League players